Spearman Independent School District is a public school district based in Spearman, Texas (USA). Located in Hansford County, portions of the district extend into Ochiltree and Hutchinson counties.

In 2009, the school district was rated "academically acceptable" by the Texas Education Agency.

Schools
Spearman High School (Grades 9-12) 
Spearman Junior High School (Grades 6-8) 
Gus Birdwell Elementary School (Grades PK-5)

References

External links
Spearman ISD

School districts in Hansford County, Texas
School districts in Ochiltree County, Texas
School districts in Hutchinson County, Texas